Myles Munroe,  (20 April 1954 – 9 November 2014) was a Bahamian evangelist and ordained minister avid professor of the Kingdom of God, author, speaker and leadership consultant who founded and led the Bahamas Faith Ministries International (BFMI) and Myles Munroe International (MMI). He was chief executive officer and chairman of the board of the International Third World Leaders Association and president of the International Leadership Training Institute as well as the author of numerous books.

Munroe and his wife died in a plane crash November 9, 2014. Bahamian officials stated their aircraft struck a crane at a ship yard near Grand Bahama International Airport. Munroe and the other passenger were heading to Grand Bahama for a conference.

Biography

Early life and education
Born Myles Egbert Munroe in 1954 in Nassau, Bahamas, Munroe grew up poor in a family of eleven children. Raised in the Nassau constituency of Bain Town, he was a lifelong resident of the Commonwealth. Munroe became a Christian during his teenage years, later attending Oral Roberts University (ORU) where he received his Bachelor of Fine Arts, Education, and Theology in 1978 and a Master’s degree in administration from the University of Tulsa in 1980. Munroe was also the recipient of honorary doctoral degrees from various schools of higher education and served as an adjunct professor of the Graduate School of Theology at ORU. He wrote a number of books.

Personal life
His wife, Ruth Munroe, served as co-pastor with him at BFMI. They got married in 1978. Together, the couple had two children, Myles, Jr. (known as Chairo), and a daughter, Charisa.

Christian ministry
Following his graduation from the University of Tulsa, Munroe founded Bahamas Faith Ministries International in the early 1980s.

Death
Munroe and his wife died in a private plane crash during airport approach on 9 November 2014. Bahamian officials stated their aircraft struck a crane at a ship yard near Grand Bahama International Airport. Munroe and the other passengers were en route to Freeport, Grand Bahama for a conference.

Awards and honours
1998: OBE for "services to religion".
1998: Bahamian "Silver Jubilee Award" for service to the Bahamas in the area of "spiritual, social and religious development".
2004: "Alumnus of the Year", Oral Roberts University.

Bibliography
Munroe was the author and coauthor of numerous books and Biblical-related study guides as well as a featured speaker on motivational and Bible-study recordings.

 "Understanding the Purpose and Power of Men"
 "Understanding the Purpose and Power of a Woman"
 "The Most Important Person on Earth"
 "Purpose and Power of Love in Marriage"
 "The Fatherhood Principle"
 "Myles Munroe on Relationship"
 "The Power of Freedom"
 "Waiting and not Dating"
 "Kingdom Parenting"
 "God's Big Idea"
 "Rediscovering the Kingdom"
 "Kingdom Principles: Preparing for Kingdom Experience and Expansion"
 "Applying the Notion: Rediscovering the Priority of God for Mankind"
 "Understanding the Purpose and Power of Karma"
 "Rediscovering Faith"
 "Purpose and Power of Praise and Worship"
 "Rediscovering Kingdom Worship"
 "Understanding Your Potential"
 "Uncover Your Potential: You are More than You Realize"
 "Releasing Your Potential: Exposing the Hidden You"
 "Maximizing Your Potential"
 "The Pursuit of Purpose"
 "Unfit For Purpose"
 "Becoming a Father"
 "The Spirit of Leadership"
 "The Principles and Power of Vision"
 "Principles and Benefits of Change"
 "In Charge"
 "Overcoming Crisis"
 "The Glory of Living: Keys to Releasing Your Personal Glory"
 "Purpose And Power Of Authority"
 "Power Of Character In Leadership: How Values, Morals, Ethics, and Principles Affect Leaders"
 "Kingdom Citizenship"
 "Passing On"

References

External links 
 Myles Munroe International home page
 Bahamas Faith Ministry International home page

1954 births
2014 deaths
Bahamian writers
Bahamian Protestant ministers and clergy
Evangelists
Religious writers
Self-help writers
Oral Roberts University alumni
University of Tulsa alumni
People from Nassau, Bahamas
Victims of aviation accidents or incidents in the Bahamas
Honorary Officers of the Order of the British Empire
Victims of aviation accidents or incidents in 2014
Christian clergy in the Bahamas